The Marriage Ref may refer to:

The Marriage Ref (American TV series)
The Marriage Ref (British TV series)